Master Blaster (born Cornelius Oloya) was a Ugandan dancehall musician. He rose to fame when he released the sexually suggestive song Emboko in 2007, which received massive airplay until 2012.

Death hoax
Master Blaster was announced dead in March 2013 when he allegedly over drunk and passed out only to gain his consciousness later. It was also alleged that he had planned the death stunt to boost his then fading music career.

Death
Master Blaster was a victim of violent chaos at a bar in Bwaise. He was shot twice in the stomach and died on 29 December 2015. His killer still remains a mystery since there are different stories as to who exactly killed the musician.

Discography
 Embooko 2007
 Ekibala 2015

See also
 Master Blaster (band) German dance band
 List of Ugandan musicians

References

1986 births
2015 deaths
Ugandan musicians